Charlie and the Chocolate Factory is a musical based on the 1964 children's novel of the same name by Roald Dahl, with book by David Greig, music by Marc Shaiman and lyrics by Shaiman and Scott Wittman.

Directed by Sam Mendes, the musical premiered in the West End at the Theatre Royal Drury Lane in June 2013 and ran for 3 years and 7 months before closing on 7 January 2017. In 2013 the production broke the record for weekly ticket sales in London. While receiving mixed reviews from critics, the show won two Laurence Olivier Awards in 2014 for Best Costume Design and Best Lighting Design. The show was reworked for a Broadway production opening in April 2017 at the Lunt-Fontanne Theatre and ran almost nine months before closing in January 2018. A U.S. Tour opened 21 September 2018 at Shea's Performing Arts Center in Buffalo, New York and an Australian Tour at Capitol Theatre on 11 January 2019. A second U.S. Tour launched on 1 January 2020 in Miami, Florida. The Broadway version of the musical has been acquired for licensing rights in North America, Europe, and Australia by Music Theatre International.

Background
The musical is based on the 1964 children's novel by Roald Dahl. Producers held a first reading of the first act from the show  in New York City in May 2010, with the intention of opening in London the following year.

Officially confirmed on 18 June 2012, producers announced that the show would play the London Palladium beginning in May 2013, with tickets going on sale in October 2012, before the venue was later changed to the Theatre Royal Drury Lane.

The book was written by playwright David Greig with original score composed by Marc Shaiman and lyrics by Scott Wittman and Shaiman. The production was directed by Sam Mendes, with choreography by Peter Darling, accompanied with the assistance of Brandon Duncan, set design by Mark Thompson and lighting design by Paul Pyant.

The show presents a more contemporary version of the original story. During previews, many changes were made, most significantly the addition of the Great Glass Elevator.

Production history

West End (2013–2017)

Charlie and the Chocolate Factory was scheduled to begin previews on 17 May 2013, at the Theatre Royal, Drury Lane, London, before holding its official opening night on 25 June 2013. The show was originally scheduled to open at the London Palladium. Previews of the show were delayed by five days until 22 May, due to "unforeseen problems in the delivery of a piece of stage engineering by a contractor". Shortly after opening night the show's producers extended booking period through May 2014, with a further extension to November 2014, after ticket sales of approximately 300,000 through October 2013. In February 2015, the production booking further extended through 3 December 2016.  The show currently holds the record for the highest weekly gross in the West End, with an income of £1,080,260 during the week commencing 30 December 2013. The first major cast change took place in May 2014, when Alex Jennings replaced Hodge as Wonka. In May 2015 a second cast change took place, with Jonathan Slinger as Wonka.

On 23 February 2016, producers once again extended booking through January 2017. The production closed on 7 January 2017.

Broadway (2017–2018)
A reworked version of the show opened on Broadway in Spring 2017 with changes including new direction by Jack O'Brien, new choreography by Josh Bergasse and a new set design by original designer Mark Thompson. Due to other commitments, Mendes stayed as producer only, but did participate in the selection of O'Brien as replacement director. O'Brien stated the score would pay homage to the Leslie Bricusse/Anthony Newley songs written for the 1971 film and would also feature the songs written by Shaiman and Wittman. In August 2016, O'Brien confirmed that "The Candy Man" and "Pure Imagination" would be included in the musical.

On 9 May 2016, producers announced that the show would open at the Lunt-Fontanne Theatre starring Christian Borle as Willy Wonka, Jake Ryan Flynn, Ryan Foust, and Ryan Sell as Charlie Bucket, John Rubinstein as Grandpa Joe, Emily Padgett as Mrs. Bucket, Jackie Hoffman as Mrs. Teavee, Kathy Fitzgerald as Mrs. Gloop, Alan H. Green as Mr. Beauregarde, Trista Dollison as Violet Beauregarde, Ben Crawford as Mr. Salt, Mike Wartella as Mike Teavee, Emma Pfaeffle as Veruca Salt, and F. Michael Haynie as Augustus Gloop. Previews began on 28 March 2017 with the opening night on 23 April 2017. Reviews of the production were mixed to negative, with some critics citing poor staging and restructuring of the story as primary issues.

For this production, the characters of Augustus Gloop, Violet Beauregarde, Veruca Salt and Mike Teavee are played by adult actors, unlike the child actors in the London production, while the character of Charlie is still filled by a child actor.

On 15 November 2017, producers announced that production would close on 14 January 2018, after 27 previews and 305 performances.

US National Tours (2018–2022)
The 1st National Tour of Charlie and the Chocolate Factory premiered on 21 September 2018 in Buffalo, New York at Shea's Performing Arts Center. It was a replica of the Broadway production, with an updated set, primarily using several LED screens around the stage. The show starred Noah Weisberg as Willy Wonka, James Young as Grandpa Joe and Amanda Rose as Mrs. Bucket, with the role of Charlie being alternated between Henry Boshart, Collin Jeffery and Rueby Wood. Reviews for the 1st National Tour were mixed. The production closed on 13 October 2019 in Tampa, Florida.

The 2nd National Tour started in Miami, Florida in January 2020 featuring Non-Equity actors. Willy Wonka was played by Cody Garcia, Grandpa Joe was played by Steve McCoy, Mrs. Bucket was played by Caitlin Lester-Sams, and the role of Charlie Bucket alternated between both Brody Bett and Ryan Umbarila. The 2nd National Tour had another update on set design, using one LED projection screen instead of several. This tour took a pause in March 2020 (while in Grand Rapids, Michigan), due to the COVID-19 pandemic. The 2nd National Tour resumed on 12 October 2021 in Syracuse, New York. As Charlie Bucket, the three boys alternating the role were Kai Edgar, Coleman Simmons, and William Goldsman.  The tour closed on 19 June 2022 in Salt Lake City, Utah, at the Eccles Theatre.

Australian Tour (2019–2021)
Previews of the Australian premiere of the musical was held at Sydney's Capitol Theatre on 5 January 2019 and opened on the 11th. The musical is a replica production of the US tour. On 13 October the primary cast was announced and includes U.S. actor Paul Slade Smith (who played Grandpa George in the original cast on Broadway) as Willy Wonka alongside Australian actors Tony Sheldon as Grandpa Joe and Lucy Maunder as Mrs Bucket. In Sydney, the role of Charlie was shared between Tommy Blair, Ryan Yates, Xion Jarvis and Oliver Alkhair. After ending its Sydney run on Sunday 28 July, the show transferred to Melbourne in August 2019 at Her Majesty's Theatre,. The show was initially scheduled to head to Brisbane in March 2020 at the Lyric Theatre, QPAC, but was postponed due to the COVID-19 pandemic. The show reopened in Brisbane on 2 September 2021. Stephen Anderson, who previously played Mr. Salt in the production took over the role of Willy Wonka. The tour made its final stop Perth in November 2021.

UK and Ireland tour (2022–2023) 
The musical will have its UK regional premiere at the Leeds Playhouse from 18 November 2022 until 28 January 2023 in a new production directed by James Brining and designed by Simon Higlett. Following the run in Leeds, the production will tour the UK and Ireland from February 2023. The casting was announced on 26 September 2022 including Gareth Snook as Willy Wonka. Reviews for the UK and Ireland Tour so far have been positive to mixed.

Other international productions
The first non-English production of Charlie and the Chocolate Factory opened on 8 November 2019 at La Fabbrica del Vapore in Milan, Italy. The production starred Christian Ginepro as Willy Wonka, with the role of Charlie shared between Gregorio Jeesee Cattaneo, Alessandro Notari, and Alberto Salve. The show closed on 23 February 2020, due to the Coronavirus pandemic.

A Norwegian production of the show opened on 9 November 2019 at Det Norske Teatret. Fridtjof Stensæth Josefsen portrayed Willy Wonka, while Ole Opsal Stavrum and Peter Andreas Hjellnes Moseng shared the role of Charlie.

A Brazilian production was announced in November 2019, produced by Atelier de Cultura. Cleto Baccic stars as Willy Wonka. The five kids are played by child actors, as in the original London production. The show was initially set to open in March 2020, at the Teatro Alfa in São Paulo. However, due to the Coronavirus pandemic, the season was postponed. The show eventually opened on 17 September 2021 at the Teatro Renault.  The production closed on 19 December 2021.

In November 2019, Alexandre Piot announced that a French production of Charlie and the Chocolate Factory would open in Paris on 23 September 2020 at the Théâtre du Gymnase Marie Bell, with Arnaud Denissel in the role of Willy Wonka. Like the London production, the five kids are all played by child actors. Due to the COVID-19 pandemic, the show was postponed. The show opened on 31 October 2021. The show moved to the Théâtre Marigny on 18 February 2022 and closed on 9 April 2022.

A Danish production opened at the Aarhus Theatre on 6 May 2021. Simon Mathew played Willy Wonka and Anders Baggesen played Grandpa Joe, while the role of Charlie was shared between Bertram Jarkilde and Oskar Mehlbye. The production closed at the Aarhus Theatre on 19 June 2021. The show transferred to the Østre Gasværk Teater on 11 February 2022 with Cartsen Svendsen in the role of Willy Wonka, alongside Kurt Ravn as Grandpa Joe and Bertram Hasforth Klem and Bertram Jarkilde sharing the role of Charlie. The production closed on 10 April 2022.

In June 2020, Deep Bridge announced a Flemish production of Charlie and the Chocolate Factory with Nordin De Moor as Willy Wonka. Originally scheduled to open in December 2021, this production opened on 11 December 2022 at Stadsschouwburg Antwerpen. The making of this production and the reveal of the actors playing Charlie were discussed in the documentary series "Getekend Charlie Bucket" ("Signed Charlie Bucket").

A Dutch production of Charlie and the Chocolate Factory began touring the Netherlands on 26 August 2022 at the Zaantheater. Much like the West End production, the five kids are played by child actors. In July 2022, it was announced that Remko Vridag will play Willy Wonka.

A Spanish production opened on 22 September 2022 at Espacio Ibercaja Delicias in Madrid, with Edu Soto as Willy Wonka.

Musical numbers

London

 Act I 
 "Almost Nearly Perfect" - Charlie Bucket
 "The Amazing Fantastical History of Mr. Willy Wonka" - Grandparents
 "A Letter from Charlie Bucket" - Charlie Bucket, Mr. Bucket, Mrs. Bucket,  and Grandparents
 "More of Him to Love" - Mrs. Gloop, Augustus Gloop, and Mr. Gloop
 "When Veruca Says" - Mr. Salt and Veruca Salt
 "The Double Bubble Duchess" † - Mr. Beauregarde, Violet Beauregarde, and Ensemble
 "It's Teavee Time!" - Mrs. Teavee and Mike Teavee
 "If Your Mother Were Here" - Mr. Bucket and Mrs. Bucket
 "Don'cha Pinch Me, Charlie" - Charlie Bucket, Grandpa Joe, Grandparents, Mr. Bucket, and Mrs. Bucket
 "It Must Be Believed to Be Seen" - Willy Wonka and Ensemble

 Act II
 "Strike That! Reverse It!" - Willy Wonka and Ensemble
 "Simply Second Nature" - Willy Wonka and Ensemble
 "Auf Wiedersehen Augustus Gloop" - Oompa-Loompas and Willy Wonka
 "Juicy!" - Oompa-Loompas and Willy Wonka
 "Veruca's Nutcracker Sweet" - Oompa-Loompas
 "Vidiots" - Oompa-Loompas, Willy Wonka and Mrs. Teavee
 "Pure Imagination" †† - Willy Wonka and Charlie Bucket
 "A Little Me" - Willy Wonka, Charlie Bucket, Oompa-Loompas, Mr. Bucket, Mrs. Bucket, and Grandparents
 "It Must Be Believed to Be Seen" (Reprise) - Willy Wonka

† Replaced, as of 2016, by "The Queen of Pop".

†† Lyrics by Leslie Bricusse, Music by Anthony Newley for the 1971 film, Willy Wonka & the Chocolate Factory.

Broadway 

 Act I
 "The Candy Man" † - Willy Wonka and Ensemble
 "Willy Wonka! Willy Wonka!" - Charlie Bucket and Ensemble
 "The Candy Man" (Reprise) † - Charlie Bucket
 "Charlie, You and I" - Grandpa Joe 
 "A Letter from Charlie Bucket" - Charlie Bucket, Mrs. Bucket, and Grandparents
 "More of Him to Love" - Mrs. Gloop, Augustus Gloop, and Ensemble
 "When Veruca Says" - Mr. Salt and Veruca Salt
 "The Queen of Pop" - Mr. Beauregarde, Violet Beauregarde, and Ensemble
 "What Could Possibly Go Wrong?" †† - Mrs. Teavee, Mike Teavee, and Ensemble  
 "If Your Father Were Here" - Mrs. Bucket
 "I've Got a Golden Ticket" † / "Grandpa Joe" - Charlie Bucket, Grandpa Joe, Grandparents, and Mrs. Bucket
 "It Must Be Believed to Be Seen" - Willy Wonka and Company

 Act II
 "Strike That! Reverse It!" - Willy Wonka and Company
 "Pure Imagination" † / "Grandpa Joe" (Reprise) - Willy Wonka, Charlie Bucket, Grandpa Joe, and the Golden Ticket Winners
 "The Oompa Loompa Song" † - Oompa Loompas
 "Auf Wiedersehen Augustus Gloop" - Willy Wonka and the Oompa Loompas
 "When Willy Met Oompa" - Willy Wonka and the Oompa-Loompas
 "Veruca's Nutcracker Sweet" – The Squirrels
 "Vidiots" – Willy Wonka, Mrs. Teavee and the Oompa-Loompas
 "The View From Here" - Willy Wonka and Charlie

UK Tour

 Act I
 "Almost Nearly Perfect" - Charlie Bucket
 "Charlie, You and I" - Grandpa Joe 
 "The Amazing Fantastical History of Mr. Willy Wonka" - Grandparents and Charlie Bucket
 "A Letter from Charlie Bucket" - Charlie Bucket, Mrs. Bucket,  and Grandparents
 "More of Him to Love" - Mrs. Gloop, Augustus Gloop, and Ensemble
 "When Veruca Says" - Mr. Salt, Veruca Salt and Ensemble
 "The Queen of Pop" - Mrs. Beauregarde, Violet Beauregarde, and Ensemble
 "Charlie, You and I" (Reprise) - Grandpa Joe 
 "The Teavee Family" †† - Mrs. Teavee, Mike Teavee, and Ensemble
 "The Candy Man" (Pre-Reprise) † - Mrs. Bucket
 "Almost Nearly Perfect" (Reprise) - Charlie Bucket
 "Don'cha Pinch Me, Charlie" - Charlie Bucket, Grandpa Joe, Grandparents, Mrs. Bucket, and Ensemble
 "You Ain't Seen Nothing Yet" / "It Must Be Believed to Be Seen" - Willy Wonka and Ensemble

 Act II
 "Strike That! Reverse It!" - Willy Wonka and Company
 "Pure Imagination" † - Willy Wonka, Charlie Bucket, Grandpa Joe, and the Golden Ticket Winners
 "Auf Wiedersehen Augustus Gloop" - Willy Wonka and the Oompa Loompas
 "HMS Wonka" - Willy Wonka, Oompa Loompas, and the Golden Ticket Winners
 "You Got Whacha You Want" - Oompa-Loompas and Willy Wonka
 "Veruca's Nutcracker Sweet" - Oompa-Loompas
 "Vidiots" - Oompa-Loompas, Willy Wonka and Mrs. Teavee
 "A Letter from Charlie Bucket" (Reprise) - Charlie Bucket
 "The View From Here" - Willy Wonka and Charlie 
 "The Candy Man" - Willy Wonka, Charlie Bucket, Mrs. Bucket, Grandparents, and Ensemble.
 "Almost Nearly Perfect" (Reprise) - Willy Wonka

† Lyrics by Leslie Bricusse, Music by Anthony Newley for the 1971 film, Willy Wonka & the Chocolate Factory.

†† Is the same song "It's Teavee Time!" with a different title.

Cast albums

Original London cast recording
A London original cast album was released on 7 October 2013.

Original Broadway cast recording
A Broadway cast recording was released digitally on 2 June and in stores on 23 June on the Masterworks Broadway label.

Orchestrations 
The West End production had a 16 piece orchestra + conductor, which was orchestrated by Doug Besterman. The Broadway production had a 17 piece orchestra + conductor, which was also orchestrated by Besterman and with additional orchestrations by Michael Starobin.

Principal roles and cast members

Notable West End replacements 

 Willy Wonka - Alex Jennings, Jonathan Slinger
 Grandpa Joe - Barry James, Kraig Thornber, Billy Boyle
 Mrs. Teavee - Josefina Gabrielle
 Mr. Bucket - Richard Dempsey

Critical reception

West End 
The West End production of Charlie and the Chocolate Factory received mixed to positive reviews from critics. While the physical production and quality of the performances were generally praised, the score and storytelling received criticism.

Broadway 
The Broadway production received mixed to negative reviews from critics. Despite the enormous overhaul to both the book and score from the London production, critics noted that the storytelling was still choppy and relied too heavily on humor. Criticism was also drawn to the decision to cast adults as the Golden Ticket winners instead of children, as well as the lackluster sets redesigned for Broadway. However, Christian Borle received widespread praise for his performance as Willy Wonka, even amongst negativity towards other aspects of the show.

Australia Tour 
Like the Broadway production, the Australian tour received mixed to poor reviews, as critics compared it unfavorably with the recent musical production of another Roald Dahl children's story, Matilda. Critic Tim Byrne found the original music "bland and unremarkable" likewise the sets and costumes, but praised the performances of Paul Slade Smith and Tony Sheldon, and the "ingenious" puppetry of the Oompa Loompas. Critic Cameron Woodhead didn't mind the sets and costumes but said deep structural issues remained leaving "a show that's too focused on showing off to remember the importance of the simple things".

Awards and nominations

London production

Broadway production

Australian production

Notes

References

External links
 

musical
Warner Bros. Theatrical
2013 musicals
Musicals based on works by Roald Dahl
Broadway musicals
West End musicals
Musicals by Marc Shaiman
Musicals by Scott Wittman
Fantasy theatre
Fiction about size change
Musicals based on films
Musicals based on novels